Allen Carpenter Beach (October 9, 1825 – October 17, 1918) was an American lawyer and politician from New York.

Life
He was born on October 9, 1825, in Fairfield, Herkimer County, New York, the son of Rev. Allen R. Beach (1797–1879) and Amy Brown Beach (1803–c.1890). He graduated from Union College in 1848, and was admitted to the bar in 1852. His first wife Abby A. Woodruff died in 1856. In 1862, he married Olivia H. Pickering, and they had one daughter, Amy.

Active in politics as a Democrat, Beach served as chairman of the Jefferson County Democratic Committee, and was a delegate to numerous county and state party conventions.  Jefferson County was a Republican stronghold, and Beach ran unsuccessfully for several offices, including county judge.  He was a delegate to the 1860 and 1876 Democratic National Conventions.

As a Democrat, he was Lieutenant Governor of New York from 1869 to 1872, elected in 1868 and 1870.

He was Secretary of State of New York from 1878 to 1879, elected in 1877 and defeated for re-election in 1879.

He died on October 17, 1918, in Rochester, New York.

Sources

Life Sketches of Executive Officers and Members of the Legislature of the State of New York by H. H. Boone & Theodore P. Cook (Weed, Parsons & Co., Albany NY, 1870; pg. 15–19)

1825 births
1918 deaths
Lieutenant Governors of New York (state)
Secretaries of State of New York (state)
Union College (New York) alumni
People from Herkimer County, New York
Politicians from Rochester, New York
19th-century American politicians
Lawyers from Rochester, New York
19th-century American lawyers